Ram Gopal Vijayvargiya (1905 – 2003) was an Indian painter. He was also a poet and a writer.

Life and career
He was born in 1905 at Baler Sawai Madhopur district in Rajasthan state in India. He learnt painting at the Maharaja School of Arts in Jaipur where the artist Asit Kumar Haldar was Principal. Later he went to Kolkata where he absorbed further influences from the Bengal School, especially the artist Shailendra Nath De whom he considered his guru

His first exhibition was held in 1928 at Fine Arts & Crafts Society, Calcutta and thereafter many in other major cities of India. His images are inspired by Indian legends and literary works. They frequently appeared as plates in literary magazines of the time such as Modern Review and Vishal Bharat, and later in Dharmyug

He was Principal of Rajasthan Kala Mandir and Rajasthan School of Art from 1945 to 1966. He was Vice President, Rajasthan Lalit Kala Akademi, 1958-60.

Publications on Vijayvargiya: 'Vijayvargiya Picture Album', 1934;  'Meghdoot Chitravali' 1945; 'Behari Chitravali', 1945; 'Rajasthani paintings', 1952; Monograph published by Lalit Kala Akademi, 1988; 'Roopankar' (biography), 1991 and volume II 'Paintings' 1995.

Awards
Maharaja Patiala, 1934
Rajasthan Lalit Kala Akademi, 1958
Padma Shri in 1984
Fellow, Lalit Kala Akademi, New Delhi 1988
Honour of ’Sahitya Vachaspati’ from Hindi Sahitya Sammelan, Prayag, 1998

Books

On Art

Vijayvargiya, Ramgopal. 1953. Rajasthani Chitrakala. Jaipur: Vijayvargiya Kala Mandal.

Fiction

Vijayvargiya, Ramgopal. 1969. Mehndi Lage Haath aur Kajal Bhari Ankhen

Vijayvargiya, Ramgopal. 1998. Vasanti. Jaipur: Sahityagar.

Vijayvargiya, Ramgopal. 1998. Madhyam marg. Jaipur: Sahityagar.

Poetry

Vijayvargiya, Ramgopal. Nisarga Mañjarī. Jaipur: Padmaśrī Rāmagopal Vijayavargīya Memoriyal Ṭrusṭ, 2005

References

External links
 Exhibition at Kumar Gallery, Delhi, 2004

Indian male painters
Rajasthani people
Recipients of the Padma Shri in arts
Fellows of the Lalit Kala Akademi
1905 births
2003 deaths
People from Sawai Madhopur district
20th-century Indian painters
Painters from Rajasthan
20th-century Indian male artists